Obertaufkirchen is a municipality  in the district of Mühldorf in Bavaria in Germany.

References

Mühldorf (district)